The Royal Viking Line was a luxury cruise line that operated from 1972 until 1998. The company was the brainchild of Warren Titus and had its headquarters at One Embarcadero Center in San Francisco.

History

The First Ships

Each of the line's initial three vessels was owned by one of its initial investing partners. The first, the Royal Viking Star, was completed in July, 1972. Its owner was Bergenske Dampskibsselskab (Bergen Line). The second, the Royal Viking Sky, was owned by Nordenfjeldske Dampskibsselskab of Trondheim. She was completed in July 1973. The third ship, the Royal Viking Sea, was ready in December of the same year. Her owner was A. F. Klaveness & Co, Oslo.

Warren S. Titus became the first president of Royal Viking Line, which established its US head office in San Francisco.

However, the Star was two feet shorter (581 feet), and her interior arrangement differed slightly from her two fleet-mates. Each ship featured a double-height theatre occupying an interior space on the two lowest passenger decks; however, on the Star the space just forward of the theatre on the higher of these decks was occupied by a chapel, a feature not found on either of her fleet-mates nor any of the Scandinavian-built cruise ships of that generation. Other differences included the placement of small lounges and facilities such as the library.

These vessels were intended for longer voyages to exotic destinations, and a significant percentage of the line's passengers were wealthy retirees. As such, they featured numerous single staterooms and suites, and thus their capacity was only about 550 compared to 750-850 on similarly-sized ships of other lines. Royal Viking Line prided itself on single-seating dining, and the restaurant was situated unusually high in the ship, with large windows. Another popular feature was a glass-enclosed lounge high atop the bridge, which afforded excellent views.

On May 1, 1976 the Royal Viking Sky and Royal Viking Star became the first sister ships to have transited the Panama Canal simultaneously in different directions, the Sky sailing westbound and the Star eastbound.

Stretching and Adding to the Fleet 

This increased each ship's capacity by 200 passengers and mainly included the addition of cabins. The size of the main restaurant was also doubled and now occupied nearly half of one deck in order to maintain single-seating dining. Royal Viking Star was stretched in 1981, followed by Royal Viking Sky in 1982 and Royal Viking Sea in 1983.

The lengthening of the ships improved both their profiles and their economics. In 1984, Torstein Hagen arranged a $240 million management buyout of the company, with the assistance of venture capital firm JH Whitney. After the buyout had been announced, but before it closed, the two companies owning Royal Viking decided to sell the company instead to Norwegian Caribbean Line, then part of the Kloster group.

Sale to Kloster Group 
The offices were moved to Coral Gables, Florida, and Warren Titus departed in 1987. While under Kloster ownership, Royal Viking built a fourth ship, the Royal Viking Sun. The final ship built for Royal Viking was the Royal Viking Queen completed in 1992. She was just , carrying only 212 passengers and sharing a general arrangement with the Seabourn Pride and Seabourn Spirit of Seabourn Cruise Line; the new home of Warren Titus.
In 1990 and 1991, Kloster moved the Royal Viking Star and the Royal Viking Sky  to its Norwegian Cruise Line brand, where they became the Westward and the Sunward and the Royal Viking Sea to its Royal Cruise Line brand, where she took the name Royal Odyssey.

In 1993, the Westward ex Royal Viking Star became the Star Odyssey for Royal Cruise Line. The passenger capacity on each of the original three ships had been increased to 850, mainly with the addition of staterooms amidships on the Bridge Deck, in what used to be officers' quarters. A buffet was also added in the lounge on the top deck, since the ships did not have the casual indoor/outdoor dining area (often called a Lido) that was becoming de rigueur. That same year, the Sunward ex Royal Viking Sky was chartered to Princess Cruises which operated her for one year as the "Golden Princess."

End of Royal Viking 
In 1994, when Kloster Cruise was in financial difficulties, the Royal Viking Line was dissolved. Royal Viking Queen was transferred to Royal Cruise Line as Queen Odyssey, while Royal Viking Sun and the Royal Viking brand were sold to Cunard Line Ltd. Cunard continued to operate the ship under the Royal Viking brand as a special segment of the Cunard fleet. Following acquisition by Carnival Corp and a merger with Seabourn Cruise Line, Cunard's Royal Viking and Sea Goddess fleets were consolidated with Seabourn Cruise Line, officially ending the use of the brand in 1999.

The Royal Viking fleet today 
After several more changes of name and ownership, the former Royal Viking Star and Royal Viking Sky sailed with Fred. Olsen Cruise Lines, the Royal Viking Star as the Black Watch and the Royal Viking Sky as the Boudicca. Aboard both ships, the lounge/buffet on the top deck has been replaced with additional passenger cabins, while the observation lounge above the bridge remains.  The length of Bridge Deck is now occupied by passenger cabins (with the ship's officers scattered around the ship).  Aboard the Black Watch, the aft portion of the formerly vast main dining-room has been converted to two smaller restaurants and an additional lounge.  A spacious, glass-lined space on the top deck hosts the fitness center and spa.  The former chapel has been carved into three additional staterooms.  The changes on Boudicca are even more radical, where the dining-room space was broken up into no fewer than four separate restaurants and the space formerly occupied by the theatre has been converted into additional staterooms and a fitness centre. In August 2020, Fred. Olsen retired the Black Watch and the Boudicca after 24 and 15 years respectively due to the COVID-19 pandemic and sold them as accommodation ships for workers in Tuzla, Istanbul. In May 2021 the Boudicca was beached for scrapping in Aliağa, Turkey. The former Royal Viking Star would follow a year later in June 2022.

The former Royal Viking Sea sailed for the German company Phoenix Reisen as the Albatros.  Layout-wise, she has probably changed the least, with the majority of public rooms remaining in their original configuration after the 1983 refit. In October 2020 Albatros was sold as a hotel vessel for the Pick Albatros Group in the Middle East, which operates some 15 hotels and resorts in Hurghada region. However, the project was never initiated, and the ship stayed at Hurghada until sold in 2021 for scrap, after a stop in Jeddah. She was beached in Alang on 27 July 2021. 

The Royal Viking Sun operated for Cunard Line with her original name until 1999, then she joined her former fleetmate, Royal Viking Queen, as the Seabourn Sun, as by this time, Seabourn had been acquired by Cunard's parent, Carnival, and merged into Cunard Line Ltd. This phase lasted until 2002, when she was transferred again to Holland America Line Inc. (another Carnival subsidiary), becoming the second , for Holland America Line, where she remained until 2019. In July 2018 the Prinsendam (ex Royal Viking Sun) was also bought by Phoenix Reisen. The ship was charted back to Holland America for one final year before transferring to Phoenix REsisen and being renamed Amera.

The Royal Viking Queen operated briefly as the Queen Odyssey for Royal Cruise Line, then joined her sister ships at Seabourn Cruise Line in 1996 as the Seabourn Legend, after Kloster liquidated Royal Cruise Line. In 2015, the Seabourn Legend was sold to Windstar Cruises as the Star Legend.

Legacy 
The Royal Viking line ships were featured prominently in the book "Voyages of the Royal Viking" by the photographer and artist Harvey Lloyd.  The book "Ever Higher, The Birth of the Royal Viking Sun" describes the line's history and construction of the line's fourth ship. Although the last remnants of the original Royal Viking Line have long been phased out, a few former owners have tried to revive elements of the original line. This includes former Royal Viking CEO Torstein Hagen, who created Viking Ocean Cruises in 2013, with new ships based on a very similar design to the Royal Viking Sun, with philosophy aligned with the original Royal Viking in service, amenities, and worldwide itineraries. Kristian Stensby, former treasurer for Kloster Cruise Ltd., the parent of Norwegian Cruise Line, Royal Cruise Line and Royal Viking Line, and now CEO of Ocean Residences Development Group, is creating a new residential ship Njord, and has revived the original Royal Viking Line logo.

Former Fleet

References

External links
Online Magazine with Royal Viking Line
Website with stories from Royal Viking Line
Simplon Postcards: Royal Viking Line
Royal Viking Queen Promotional Film (1992)

Defunct shipping companies of Norway
Defunct cruise lines
Transport companies established in 1972
Transport companies disestablished in 1998
Norwegian companies established in 1972
1998 disestablishments in Norway